Live – An Epic Music Experience is a live album created by the music production company Two Steps from Hell, released on November 4, 2022. It is distributed by Sony Classical Records digitally, on CD (two discs), and vinyl (three discs). It is the group's first live album. 

The album entirely comprises recordings of songs performed live during concerts forming the group's 2022 European tour, their first concert tour, which concluded four months prior to its release. It consists of all 28 tracks that comprised the tour's setlist, written by composers Thomas J. Bergersen and Nick Phoenix. It features an assortment of songs from the group's entire 16-year catalog, including numerous greatest hits; many were newly arranged (to varying degrees) for the purpose of performing them live in a concert hall and feature as such versions on the album.

Credited artists who performed live on stage with Bergersen and Phoenix include vocalists Úyanga Bold, Merethe Soltvedt, Kamila Nývltová and Rechoir, as well as instrumentalists Esther Abrami, Eliane Correa, Greg Ellis, Skye Emanuel, Helen Nash, Kamila Nývltová, Saulius Petreikis and the Odessa Opera Orchestra.

Track listing
The following shows the track listing of the CD release.

Disc 1

Disc 2

Critical reception
The review at  called it "pure pleasure, thrilling, with goosebumps, emotions and full of cinematic moments" and rated it 10 out of 10.

Charts

References

External links

2022 albums
Two Steps from Hell albums
Sony Classical Records albums